The 1983 CCHA Men's Ice Hockey Tournament was the 12th CCHA Men's Ice Hockey Tournament. It was played between March 4 and March 12, 1983. First round games were played at campus sites, while 'final four' games were played at Joe Louis Arena in Detroit, Michigan. By winning the tournament, Michigan State received the Central Collegiate Hockey Association's automatic bid to the 1983 NCAA Division I Men's Ice Hockey Tournament.

Format
The tournament featured three rounds of play. The four teams that finished below eighth place in the standings were not eligible for postseason play. In the quarterfinals, the first and eighth seeds, the second and seventh seeds, the third seed and sixth seeds and the fourth seed and fifth seeds played a two-game series where the team that scored the higher number of goals after the games was declared the victor and advanced to  the semifinals. In the semifinals, the remaining highest and lowest seeds and second highest and second lowest seeds play a single-game, with the winners advancing to the finals. The tournament champion receives an automatic bid to the 1983 NCAA Division I Men's Ice Hockey Tournament.

Conference standings
Note: GP = Games played; W = Wins; L = Losses; T = Ties; PTS = Points; GF = Goals For; GA = Goals Against

Bracket

Note: * denotes overtime period(s)

First round

(1) Bowling Green vs. (8) Notre Dame

(2) Michigan State vs. (7) Ferris State

(3) Ohio State vs. (6) Miami

(4) Michigan Tech vs. (5) Northern Michigan

Semifinals

(1) Bowling Green vs. (5) Northern Michigan

(2) Michigan State vs. (3) Ohio State

Consolation Game

(3) Ohio State vs. (5) Northern Michigan

Championship

(1) Bowling Green vs. (2) Michigan State

Tournament awards

All-Tournament Team
F Kelly Miller (Michigan State)
F Gord Flegel (Michigan State)
F Dan Kane (Bowling Green)
D Garry Galley (Bowling Green)
D Mike Pikul (Bowling Green)
G Mike David* (Bowling Green)
* Most Valuable Player(s)

References

External links
CCHA Champions
1982–83 CCHA Standings
1982–83 NCAA Standings

CCHA Men's Ice Hockey Tournament
Ccha tournament